Three Nocturnes can refer to

Nocturnes, Op. 15 (Chopin)
Nocturnes, Op. 9 (Chopin)
Nocturnes (Debussy)